Ài jiǔ jiàn rénxīn "Love Reveals in the Long Run" is the 12th studio album by Fish Leong.  It was released on 10 August 2012 by Universal Music Taiwan.

Track listing

References

Fish Leong albums
2012 albums
Universal Music Taiwan albums
Mandopop albums